The Constant Nymph is a 1928 British silent film drama, directed by Adrian Brunel and starring Ivor Novello and Mabel Poulton. This was the first film adaptation of the 1924 best-selling and controversial novel The Constant Nymph by Margaret Kennedy and the 1926 stage play version written by Kennedy and Basil Dean. The theme of adolescent sexuality reportedly discomfited the British film censors, until they were reassured that lead actress Poulton was in fact in her 20s.

Location filming took place in the Austrian Tyrol, and the film proved a commercial and critical success, being named the best British feature film of 1928. Jo Botting of the British Film Institute notes: "The progression through the film is from light to darkness, from space to enclosure and from hope to despair."

Plot
Young composer Lewis Dodd (Novello) travels to Austria to visit his mentor Albert Sanger (Georg Henrich). He meets Sanger's teenage daughters Tessa (Poulton), Antonia (Benita Hume), and Pauline (Dorothy Boyd) and Sanger's third wife Linda (Mary Clare), who does not appear to be liked by Sanger's daughters. The atmosphere is jovial and celebratory, until Sanger dies very suddenly.

Lewis contacts the girls' uncle in Cambridge, who comes to Austria accompanied by his daughter Florence (Frances Doble). After a whirlwind courtship Lewis proposes to Florence, who eagerly accepts his offer of marriage. Tessa is distraught at the news. It is decided that Tessa and Pauline will be sent to a boarding school in England. Meanwhile, Lewis and Florence attempt to settle down in London, but find that in the home setting things are very different and Lewis comes to feel trapped by the superficiality of London society and the realisation of his wife's ambitious, pushy nature.

Tessa and Pauline are unhappy at school and decide to run away, arriving at the home of Lewis and Florence on the evening on which Florence has arranged a musical recital designed to showcase Lewis' talents to her influential friends. Florence is extremely annoyed by the interruption to her evening and allows the girls to stay, but with ill-disguised bad grace. Lewis is angry at his wife's attitude, and ends up taking her to task in front of the gathering, leaving her humiliated.

The atmosphere in the household deteriorates as the attraction between Lewis and Tessa becomes increasingly obvious. Lewis begins to treat Florence with increasing disdain and lack of respect. As the date of Lewis' first public performance draws near, he decides to leave Florence after the concert, and Tessa agrees to leave with him. Florence is suspicious that something is afoot, challenges Tessa and the two end up in a serious argument, after which Florence forbids Tessa from attending the concert.

Left locked in alone at home on the evening of the concert, Tessa manages to escape through a window and makes her way to the theatre. Lewis' performance is a big success, but afterwards he ignores the congratulatory gathering Florence has assembled in his dressing room, and instead heads off with Tessa to catch the boat train for Belgium. Tessa begins to feel ill as she boards the boat and her condition deteriorates as the journey progresses. When they finally arrive at a dreary back-street lodging house in Brussels, it is clear that Tessa is seriously ill and the guilt-stricken Lewis begins to write a letter to Tessa's uncle begging for help and attempting to make it clear that he alone is responsible for the situation and Tessa has done nothing to merit reproach. Before he can finish the letter however, Tessa collapses and dies.

Cast
 Ivor Novello as Lewis Dodd
 Mabel Poulton as Tessa Sanger
 Frances Doble as Florence
 Mary Clare as Linda Sanger
 Dorothy Boyd as Pauline Sanger
 Benita Hume as Antonia Sanger
 Georg Henrich as Albert Sanger
 Tony de Lungo as Roberto
 Evan Thomas as Ike
 Yvonne Thomas as Kate Sanger
 Clifford Heatherley as Sir Berkeley
 Elsa Lanchester as Lady

Preservation status
Thought to have been lost, the film was found as a result of a 1992 British Film Institute campaign to locate missing movies.

References

Bibliography
 Low, Rachael. History of the British Film, 1918–1929. George Allen & Unwin, 1971.

External links 
 
 
 
 The Constant Nymph at the British Film Institute's Screenonline

1928 films
1928 drama films
British drama films
British silent feature films
British black-and-white films
Films directed by Adrian Brunel
Films set in London
Films set in Austria
Gainsborough Pictures films
Films based on British novels
Films about composers
1920s rediscovered films
Rediscovered British films
1920s British films
Silent drama films